The Deutsche Akademie für Sprache und Dichtung (in English German Academy for Language and Literature) was founded on 28 August 1949, on the 200th birthday of Johann Wolfgang von Goethe, in the Paulskirche in Frankfurt. It is seated in Darmstadt, since 1971 in the Glückert House at the Darmstadt Artists' Colony. It is a society of writers and scholars on matters pertaining to German language and literature in the Deutsche sprachraum, or Germanosphere.

Conferences
 Spring conference at changing locations in Germany and abroad
 Autumn conference in Darmstadt

Literary awards
 Since 1951 it has awarded the Georg Büchner Prize, the most important literary prize in the German language (awarded at autumn conference).
 The Sigmund Freud Prize, was instituted in memory of Sigmund Freud in 1964 (awarded at autumn conference).
 That same year, the annual Friedrich-Gundolf-Preis was instituted for the promotion of German culture in foreign countries, in memory of Friedrich Gundolf (awarded at spring conference).
 Johann-Heinrich-Merck-Preis (awarded at autumn conference)
 Johann-Heinrich-Voß-Preis für Übersetzung (awarded at spring conference)

Notable members
Source:

Ilse Aichinger
Hannah Arendt
Ingeborg Bachmann
Lukas Bärfuss
Jurek Becker
Gottfried Benn
Thomas Bernhard
Heinrich Böll
Nicolas Born
Pierre Boulez
Volker Braun
Joseph Breitbach
Alfred Brendel
Carl Dahlhaus
Heimito von Doderer
Tankred Dorst
Friedrich Dürrenmatt
Adolf Endler
Péter Esterházy
Max Frisch
Hans-Georg Gadamer
Lars Gustafsson
Jürgen Habermas
Hans Werner Henze
Theodor Heuss
Ernst Jandl
Elfriede Jelinek
Walter Jens
Uwe Johnson
Erich Kästner
Hermann Kasack
Hermann Kesten
Thomas Kling
Karl Krolow
Hermann Lenz
Siegfried Lenz
Golo Mann
Robert Menasse
Terézia Mora
Herta Müller
Adolf Muschg
Christoph Ransmayr
Jan Philipp Reemtsma
Erich Maria Remarque
Wolfgang Rihm
Oda Schaefer
Wolfdietrich Schnurre
Saša Stanišić
Hans Heinz Stuckenschmidt
Martin Walser
Carl Friedrich von Weizsäcker
Christa Wolf
Adam Zagajewski
Carl Zuckmayer

References

External links
 German Academy for Language and Literature

Darmstadt
Learned societies of Germany
1949 establishments in Germany
Organizations established in 1949